Florida State Road 4A may refer to:
Florida State Road 4A (pre-1945), a number of old alignments of US 1 in the Florida Keys still known locally as 4A
County Road 4A (Florida), several spurs of the post-1945 SR 4